İzmir Atatürk Volleyball Hall is a volleyball venue located in the district of Alsancak in İzmir, Turkey.

After serving as the indoor sport hall for competitions of basketball, volleyball and handball for 40 years, it has been rebuilt to serve as the volleyball hall of the city and has a capacity of 6,000 people. Along with other local teams, İzmir's volleyball powerhouse Arkas plays its matches in this hall.

International events hosted

İzmir Atatürk Volleyball Hall hosted basketball games of the Universiade 2005, which was held  between August 11 and 21 2005 in İzmir. It also hosted 15 games of the Group B in the preliminary round of the Eurobasket 2005 Women from September 2 to 7 2005.

2013 FIVB Men's Junior World Championship 22 August-1 September
2015 Women's European Volleyball League - Leg 4 and 5 21-30 August 2015

References
 Ministry of Youth and Sports-İzmir Region, Volleyball Section 
 Arkas Sports Club 
 Karşıyaka Sports Club 
 Bornova Anadolu Lisesi 

Atatürk Volleyball Hall
Indoor arenas in Turkey
Volleyball venues in Turkey
Sports venues completed in 1971
1971 establishments in Turkey
Things named after Mustafa Kemal Atatürk